Huntington-Surrey School is a private non-sectarian college preparatory high school located in Austin, Texas. It was founded in 1973 and is located northwest of the University of Texas campus.

The school's goal is to produce young adults who graduate with the tools and the desire to keep learning throughout their lives. Individual attention and a personalized educational experience come from a low student-to-teacher ratios: 8-1 in core classes, 6-1 in math, and 1-1 in the literature program, which is based on the British tutorial method.

The school offers a personal educational experience curriculum with a particular focus on composition and literature, with standard science, history, and math classes also required. Electives, which are offered on Fridays, draw on the various interests and talents of the faculty.

Some remarkable features of the student experience at Huntington-Surrey include the very small class sizes and the school days with built-in help for accomplishing homework assignments, including math homework always done in the presence of a math teacher. The school is accredited by Cognia (formerly AdvancED/ Southern Association of Colleges and Schools).

Alumni 

Notable alumni, in order of the most recent year of attendance (if known), then alphabetically by last name:
 2003 - Andrew Cadima, composer
 2003 - Thomas Herndon, economist
 1994 - Talia Fernòs, mathematician

References

External links 
 Official web site
 Accreditation

High schools in Austin, Texas
Private high schools in Texas
Preparatory schools in Texas